German Polish or Polish German may refer to:
German–Polish relations
German minority in Poland
Polish minority in Germany